Too Fast for Love is the debut studio album by American heavy metal band Mötley Crüe. The first edition of 900 copies was released on November 10, 1981, on the band's original label Leathür Records. Elektra Records signed the band the following year, at which point the album was remixed and partially re-recorded. This re-release, with a different track listing and slightly different artwork (e.g., red lettering on the cover and a different interior photograph of the band), has become the standard version from which all later reissues derive. The re-recorded album also removed the song "Stick to Your Guns", though it is featured on a bonus track version of the album. The original mix of the album remained unreleased on CD until 2002, when it was included in the Music to Crash Your Car To: Vol. 1 box set compilation.

While the album only reached number 77 on the Billboard 200 album chart in the United States, it would ultimately reach platinum status.

The songs "Stick to Your Guns" and "Live Wire" were released as singles for the album. The cover is an homage to The Rolling Stones' 1971 album Sticky Fingers.

Release history
The first recording session was in October 1981, a half year after the band first played the Starwood nightclub. They recorded for a few days with engineer Avi Kipper at Hit City West, a small studio in the Hollywood district of Los Angeles.

There are three known vinyl pressings of the Leathür Records version, along with one known cassette. The first vinyl pressing had white lettering on the cover and the record label was white with black lettering. The back cover photo of Vince Neil shows him with a large airbrushed hairdo. The second pressing has red lettering on the cover and the record label is again white with black lettering. The second pressing has a slightly different photo insert of the band. The third pressing has red lettering on the cover and the record label is black with white lettering.

The album was remixed under the supervision of Roy Thomas Baker and rereleased on August 20, 1982, by Elektra Records, with whom the band signed its first recording contract. The Elektra version had a different track order and omitted "Stick to Your Guns", as well as the first verse from the title track. In addition, a re-recorded (and shorter) version of "Come On and Dance" appears on the re-release. However, the initial release of the album on Elektra in Canada (on both vinyl and cassette) was not the remixed version, but instead the original Leathür version with an Elektra label on it, and it included "Stick to Your Guns". This was released two months before the remixed version was released by Elektra worldwide, because Mötley was about to embark on a Canadian tour and Elektra wanted to ensure a product was available while the band was in the country. When the remixed version was completed, later Canadian pressings were the same as the Elektra version everywhere else. "It was amazing because everyone had passed on us first time around..." Neil observed in 2000. "We were just happy that someone was prepared to mass-produce our records and that we could go out on real tours."

In 1996, Mötley and Elektra split. The band once again formed their own record company, Mötley Records, and rereleased all the albums before New Tattoo. The 2002 version of Too Fast for Love adds the Leathür version of "Too Fast for Love", "Stick to Your Guns" (omitted from the Elektra release), "Toast of the Town" (previously released as a B-side to Leathür's "Stick to Your Guns" single), the Raspberries cover song "Tonight" and a live version of "Merry-Go-Round".

Reception

Too Fast for Love has received mostly positive reviews. AllMusic reviewer Steve Huey gave the album a rating of four stars and claims that "Mötley Crüe essentially comes across as a bash-'em-out bar band, making up in enthusiasm what they lack in technical skill". 

Too Fast for Love was also the earliest of seven consecutive Mötley Crüe studio albums to be certified gold or platinum by the RIAA―every album up to and including Generation Swine (1997) is at least certified gold.

Track listings

1981 Leathür Records original release

1982 Elektra version

Personnel

Mötley Crüe
Vince Neil – lead vocals
Mick Mars – guitars, backing vocals
Nikki Sixx – bass
Tommy Lee – drums, backing vocals

Production
Gleen Felt – engineer
Azi Kipper, Robert Battaglia – additional engineers
Michael Wagener – engineer, mixing
Jo Hansch – mastering
Bradley Gilderman – additional overdubs and edits
Gordon Fordyce – remixing
Roy Thomas Baker – remixing advisor

Charts

Certifications

Accolades

See also
List of glam metal albums and songs

References

1981 debut albums
Mötley Crüe albums
Elektra Records albums